The Men's 4x200m Freestyle Relay event at the 2003 Pan American Games took place on August 13, 2003. There were only eight entries and therefore no preliminary heats for this event.

Medalists

Records

Results

Notes

References
swimmers-world

Freestyle Relay, Men's 4x200m